Gymnopilus zempoalensis is a mushroom in the family Hymenogastraceae. Found in Mexico, it was described as a species new to science in 1984.

See also
List of Gymnopilus species

References

Fungi described in 1984
Fungi of Mexico
zempoalensis
Fungi without expected TNC conservation status